Taronga: Who's Who in the Zoo is an Australian factual television series which goes behind the scenes at both Taronga Zoo Sydney and Taronga Western Plains Zoo at Dubbo. It is produced by McAvoy Media and follows the 240 keepers and vets caring for 5,000 animals. The ten part series is narrated by actress Naomi Watts.

The first series of the program premiered on 8 February 2020. The series was placed on hiatus from 21 March due to special A Current Affair broadcasts focusing on the COVID-19 pandemic occupying the program's timeslot. The program returned on 20 May 2020. The second series premiered on 22 October 2021.

Episodes

Season 1 (2020)

Season 2 (2021–22)

Notes
This episode did not air on this night in New South Wales and Queensland due to coverage of the 2020 All Stars match, and aired at a later date.

References

External links

Taronga: Who's Who in the Zoo – Production website
Secrets of the Zoo: Down Under – Production website

Nine Network original programming
2020 Australian television series debuts
Australian factual television series
English-language television shows
Zoos